BRICS Universities League is a consortium of leading research universities from BRICS countries including Brazil, Russia, India, China, and South Africa. Initiated at Fudan University, Shanghai on July 6, 2013, the League aims to become a platform for academic and expert cooperation, comparative research, and international educational projects. In October 2015, around 40 outstanding universities from the five BRICS countries gathered in Beijing Normal University, Beijing to hold the BRICS Universities Presidents Forum. After this Forum, the participating universities declared the Beijing Consensus, and they decided to establish the BRICS Universities League. The League Secretariat is located in Beijing Normal University, with the BNU as a leading university in terms of BRICS higher education and academic cooperation. The League is expanding to attract more and more outstanding BRICS universities to participate in its activities. The BRICS Universities League has performed as a strategic pillar for the BRICS cooperation.

Current members

Brazil

China

India

Russia

South Africa

References 

 

International college and university associations and consortia
College and university associations and consortia in Asia
BRICS
Organizations established in 2013